Loka pri Dobrni is a small dispersed settlement in the hills northwest of Dobrna in Slovenia. The area is part of the traditional region of Styria. The Municipality of Dobrna is now included in the Savinja Statistical Region.

Name
The name of the settlement was changed from Loka to Loka pri Dobrni in 1953.

References

External links
Loka pri Dobrni on Geopedia

Populated places in the Municipality of Dobrna